The 1908 Southern Intercollegiate Athletic Association football season was the college football games played by the member schools of the Southern Intercollegiate Athletic Association as part of the 1908 college football season. The season began on September 26.

LSU won the SIAA championship, but amidst fears of many players being ineligible under SIAA rules most sportswriters did not include them for consideration. Its season was clouded by accusations of professionalism from Grantland Rice and rival school Tulane which was also undefeated in southern play.  Despite this, the SIAA eventually cleared LSU of any wrongdoing. LSU featured Hall of Fame quarterback Doc Fenton.

Auburn and Vanderbilt were among those listed as alternative SIAA champions. The newspapers unanimously handed the title to Auburn. Auburn featured first-year halfback Lew Hardage. Vanderbilt had a down year with a wealth of sophomores; guided shrewdly by McGugin to its success.

The Tennessee Volunteers  compiled four wins in SIAA play, the most in team history. It was widely considered the best Tennessee football season up to that point.  Vanderbilt coach Dan McGugin noted "All things considered, Leach was perhaps the best football player of the year in  Dixie."

Results and team statistics

Key

PPG = Average of points scored per game
PAG = Average of points allowed per game

Regular season

SIAA teams in bold.

Unknown

Week One

Week Two

Week Three

Week Four

Week Five

Week Six

Week Seven

Week Eight

Week Nine

Week Ten

Awards and honors

All-Southern team

The consensus All-Southern team:

Selectors include John Heisman (H), Dan McGugin (DM), and Nash Buckingham (NB).

Notes

References